The Kapila is a river in Maharashtra. It is a minor tributary of the Godavari river, India's second longest river after the Ganga. The river is named after Rishi Kapila.

Gallery photos

References 

Rivers of Maharashtra
Tributaries of the Godavari River
Rivers of India